"Wonderful to Be Young" is a song written by Burt Bacharach and Hal David and released as a single by Cliff Richard and the Shadows in September 1962, from their album Wonderful to Be Young.

Background and release 
For release in North America, Paramount Pictures decided to retitle and re-edit the film The Young Ones, in which Richard stars. A new opening sequence was commissioned as well as a new title song. With the film retitled Wonderful to Be Young!, songwriting duo Bacharach and David wrote the title track and it was recorded by Cliff Richard and the Shadows at EMI Studios, (later renamed Abbey Road Studios) and features piano by Max Harris and female backing vocals by the Mike Sammes Singers.

"Wonderful to Be Young" was only released as a single in the US and Canada, with the B-side "Got a Funny Feeling", written by the Shadows' Hank Marvin and Bruce Welch, which was previously released as the B-side to "When the Girl in Your Arms Is the Girl in Your Heart". The original version of "Wonderful to Be Young" has never been released in the UK; however, a remixed version was released on the 1964 EP A Forever Kind of Love, retitled "It's a Wonderful Life", and several different versions have been released since.

Track listing
 "Wonderful to Be Young" – 2:39
 "Got a Funny Feeling" – 2:54

Personnel
 Cliff Richard – vocals
 Hank Marvin – lead guitar
 Bruce Welch – rhythm guitar
 Brian Locking – bass guitar
 Tony Meehan – drums
 Max Harris – piano
 The Mike Sammes Singers – backing vocals

Chart position

References

Cliff Richard songs
1962 singles
Songs with music by Burt Bacharach
Songs with lyrics by Hal David
Songs written for films
Columbia Graphophone Company singles
Song recordings produced by Norrie Paramor
1962 songs